Charles Himrod (November 4, 1842 – January 26, 1920) was an American politician who served as mayor of Boise, Idaho Territory, in the 1860s and 1870s.

Himrod served three consecutive one-year terms despite being elected only in 1869 and 1870. The winner of the 1871 mayoral election, John Hailey, never took office. According to city records Himrod served that term as well.

Himrod returned as Boise mayor in 1878 to serve another one-year term.

References

 Mayors of Boise - Past and Present
 Idaho State Historical Society Reference Series, Corrected List of Mayors, 1867-1996

Mayors of Boise, Idaho
1842 births
1920 deaths